Kamyshovka is a rural locality (a khutor) in Kaysatskoye Rural Settlement, Pallasovsky District, Volgograd Oblast, Russia. The population was 26 as of 2010.

Geography 
Kamyshovka is located in steppe, on the Caspian Depression, 31 km southwest of Pallasovka (the district's administrative centre) by road. Korolyovka is the nearest rural locality.

References 

Rural localities in Pallasovsky District